Davi Ribeiro de Carvalho (born 31 August 1979), known simply as Davi, is a Brazilian futsal player who last played for the French club Sporting de Paris as a defender.

Career
Born in Porto Alegre, Brazil, Davi started developing his futsal skills at Cruzeiro Esporte Clube, playing in the futsal section from age 7 to age 11, then shifting to the football section, until he was 14. Two years later, at 16, he joined América Mineiro, still as a footballer, leaving when he was 19. Unable to find a football club, his fitness coach at América, arranged a tryout for him at Minas Tênis Clube, which he successfully passed.

In 2003, Davi joined the Belgian team Kickers Charleroi, reuniting with a number of friends, before moving to the larger Action 21 in the following year. In his first year at Action 21, he conquered the 2004–05 UEFA Futsal Cup by beating Dinamo Moskva in the final. A year later, impressed by his performance against them, Sporting CP, contacted him and brought him to Portugal, where he would spend three years with the Lions, winning two titles.

On 2 April 2009, Davi agreed to trade Sporting for crosstown rivals, Benfica for the following season. At Benfica, he made an immediate impact, scoring the decisive goal against Interviu at the 2009–10 UEFA Futsal Cup Final, on 25 April 2010, and being honoured with Most Valuable Player award. In the following three years, he conquered his first league title in Portugal, also winning another Portuguese Cup, plus three more supercups.

On 30 June 2013, Davi, together with César Paulo and Diego Sol, were released by Benfica, The 34-year-old then moved to Araz Naxçivan in the Azerbaijan league, reaching a third place in the 2013–14 UEFA Futsal Cup. On 30 October 2014, he moved to Sporting de Paris, progressing no further than the group stage of the 2014–15 UEFA Futsal Cup.

Honours
Action 21 Charleroi
 UEFA Futsal Cup: 2004–05

Sporting CP
 Taça de Portugal: 2007–08
 Supertaça de Portugal: 2008

Benfica
 UEFA Futsal Cup: 2009–10
 Liga Portuguesa: 2011–12
 Taça de Portugal: 2011–12
 Supertaça de Portugal: 2009, 2011, 2012

Araz Naxçivan
 Azerbaijan Futsal Premier League: 2013—14

References

1979 births
Living people
Sportspeople from Porto Alegre
Brazilian men's futsal players
Minas Tênis Clube players
Sporting CP futsal players
S.L. Benfica futsal players
Araz Naxçivan players
Brazilian expatriate sportspeople in Portugal
Brazilian expatriate sportspeople in Azerbaijan
Brazilian expatriate sportspeople in France